Farebi Shahzada also called The Shepherd, is a 1931 Indian cinema's action silent film directed by A. R. Kardar. The film was also known as Gudaria Sultan or The Shepherd King and was the fourth of seven films Kardar produced under Kardar's United Players Corporation, Lahore.

The film starred Gul Hamid, Gulzar and M. Ismail with Hiralal. The other actors in the cast included Hassan Din, Ahmed Din, Haider Shah and Fazal Shah. Farebi Shahzada, like Kardar's earlier films was also released at The Deepak cinema in Bhati Gate area of Lahore.

Cast
 Gulzar
 M. Ismail
 Hiralal
 Hassan Din
 Haider Shah
 Fazal Shah
 Ahmed Din

References

External links

1931 films
Lollywood
Silent action films
Indian silent films
Indian black-and-white films
Films directed by A. R. Kardar
Indian action films
1930s action films